Volodymyr Romaniv (born June 16, 1985) is a Ukrainian footballer who played as a midfielder

Playing career 
Romaniv began his career in 2005 with FSC Bukovyna Chernivtsi in the Ukrainian Second League, where he appeared in 10 matches. In 2011, he signed with FC Rukh Vynnyky in the Lviv Oblast League where he won the Lviv Oblast title, Lviv Oblast Super Cup, and Lviv Oblast Cup. In 2016, he went overseas to Canada to play with FC Ukraine United of the Canadian Soccer League. In his second season he assisted FC Ukraine in achieving a perfect season, and winning the Second Division Championship. While in his third year he assisted in securing the First Division title.

References

External links
 

1985 births
Living people
Ukrainian footballers
Ukrainian expatriate footballers
Association football midfielders
FC Bukovyna Chernivtsi players
FC Rukh Lviv players
FC Ukraine United players
Canadian Soccer League (1998–present) players
Ukrainian expatriate sportspeople in Canada
Expatriate soccer players in Canada
Ukrainian Second League players